Gmina Słupia Konecka is a rural gmina (administrative district) in Końskie County, Świętokrzyskie Voivodeship, in south-central Poland.

History
Until 1954 the gmina was named Pijanów, former municipal seat and currently a hamlet of Słupia Konecka. The gmina was named Słupia from 1973 to 1999, and Słupia (Konecka) from 1999 to 2017, when it took the current name.

Geography
It contains part of the protected area called Przedbórz Landscape Park.

Villages
Gmina Słupia contains the villages and settlements of Biały Ług, Budzisław, Czerwona Wola, Czerwona Wola-Kolonia, Hucisko, Hucisko-Bania, Mnin, Mnin-Błagodać, Mnin-Mokre, Mnin-Przymusów, Mnin-Szwedy, Olszówka Pilczycka, Piaski, Pijanów, Pilczyca, Radwanów, Radwanów-Kolonia, Ruda Pilczycka, Rytlów, Skąpe, Słomiana, Słupia, Słupia-Bukowie, Słupia-Gabrielów, Słupia-Podwole, Wólka, Wólka-Konradów, Wólka-Mogielnica and Zaostrów.

Neighbouring gminas
Gmina Słupia is bordered by the gminas of Fałków, Krasocin, Łopuszno, Przedbórz, Radoszyce and Ruda Maleniecka.

References

External links

Slupia Konecka
Końskie County